Vulcanobatrachus is an extinct genus of fossil frog. The genus contains the single species Vulcanobatrachus mandelai found at Marydale, South Africa, described in 2005 and named after Nelson Mandela. The genus owes its name to the fact that fossils were recovered from an extinct volcanic crater lake of Late Cretaceous age. The fossil frogs are assumed to have died following a limnic eruption (a degassing event possibly of CO2) by the volcano.

The existence of fossil specimens was discovered accidentally in the late 1970s during prospecting of the volcanic kimberlite pipe for diamonds by de Beers Mining Company. Specimens of Vulcanobatrachus mandelai are curated by Iziko South African Museum.

It is a member of the clade Pipimorpha, related to the family Pipidae.

See also

 Prehistoric amphibian
 List of prehistoric amphibians

References

Pipidae
Late Cretaceous amphibians of Africa
Fossil taxa described in 2005